Nine ships of the Royal Navy have been named HMS Supply.

  was a 6-gun fireship purchased in 1672 and expended in 1673.
  was a 9-gun fireship purchased in 1688.  Her fate is unknown.
  was a 4-gun hoy launched in 1725 and captured in 1752
  was a 4-gun armed tender launched in 1759 and sold in 1792; she played an important part in the foundation of Australia.
  was a 26-gun storeship, originally in civilian service as the Prince of Wales. She was purchased in 1777 and destroyed in accidental fire in 1779.
  was a 20-gun storeship purchased in 1781 and sold in 1784.
  was a 10-gun storeship, of 388 tons (bm), originally the American mercantile New Brunswick, which the Admiralty purchased in 1793 as an armed vessel for the colony at Botany Bay; she was broken up there in 1806.
  was a transport launched in 1798 and broken up in 1834.
  was an iron-screw storeship purchased whilst under construction in 1854. She had been broken up by 1879.

References

Royal Navy ship names